Tugs is a 1989 British children's television series created by the producer and director of Thomas the Tank Engine & Friends respectively, Robert D. Cardona and David Mitton. It features two anthropomorphized tugboat fleets: the Star Fleet and the Z-Stacks. They compete against each other in the fictional Bigg City Port.

In the North American adaptation, Salty's Lighthouse, the stories were re-purposed for a younger audience. The two groups were no longer rival tug fleets, and the characters underwent various changes. Sunshine, Captain Star, and Little Ditcher were considered female. Sunshine became the sister of fellow switcher Ten Cents. British accents were changed to American accents. Some names were changed, for instance, Big Mac became Big Stack, O.J. became Otis, and Zebedee became Zeebee.

Star Fleet
The Star Fleet is a family of boats who aim to work together on getting and fulfilling port contracts. It is led by Captain Star. Its symbol is a red funnel with blue and white stripes around the top. Fleet members have yellow Superstructures and also carry a red flag with a white star resembling the American flag. Reporting to Captain Star are seven tugs, each of which has a numbered smoke stack. In "Regatta", Grampus the Submarine becomes a member of Star Fleet. The Star Fleet tugs are modeled after the San Francisco tugs of the 1920s.

Ten Cents works as a switcher tug on a wide variety of tasks around Bigg City Port, and is number 1. Ten Cents is one of the younger, and he is one of the braver Star Tugs. He has a tendency to be somewhat cheeky at times, but is strong-willed, and it takes a lot to break him. He is quick-witted and takes action swiftly without hesitation. He never lets other tugs bully him, never fails to stand up for others, and is always willing to set aside his own safety for the sake of others. He has a bit of a short temper, but he is also smart enough to listen to the advice of the older, more experienced tugs. He speaks with a teenage East End Cockney accent. Chris Tulloch notes that Ten Cents was the first model he built for the series: "Ten Cents was 20 [inches] long, and his hull (fibreglass) was the basis for Zip and Zug." Ten Cents was voiced by Simon Nash. In the Japanese dub, he was voiced by Shigeru Nakahara. In Salty's Lighthouse, he was voiced by Ian James Corlett.
Big Mac is a harbour tug who speaks with a Scottish accent, and is number 2. He can come across as a rude and stubborn tug, but he has a heart of gold, despite his tendencies to be macho, gruff and tough at times. He is very much willing to set aside his own safety for the sake of others, and usually (but not always) remains level-headed when undergoing a strategy. Big Mac works mainly with Warrior, and the two tugs have a very close friendship. Even though Warrior's clumsiness and thick head occasionally frustrates him, he still respects and cares for him. He also stands up for Warrior if anyone makes fun of him. As opposed to his gruff personality, he is fitted with a rich and melodic chime whistle. Big Mac was voiced by Sean Barrett. In the Japanese dub, he was voiced by Keiji Fujiwara. In Salty's Lighthouse, he was named Big Stack and was voiced by Paul Dobson.
O.J. is the sole remaining paddle-driven harbour tug in Bigg City Port, and is number 3. He can be described as "slow, but versatile". As Captain Star once said in "Quarantine", "He had given many years of good service, but time was catching up on him". He is indeed capable of a variety of tasks, but is sometimes restricted by his age and mechanical condition. He speaks with a South Welsh accent. His basis is that of Eppleton Hall. Chris Tulloch noted that the O.J. model used in the series was one of the most reliable. Other models, which had internal machinery, would often threaten to "turn turtle" and would have to be fixed firmly to a chassis. After the production of Tugs was shut down, his model was passed on to the sister series Thomas & Friends to be converted into "Lakesider lll", seen on the Skarloey Railway on Series 4. His model was later sold to The Star Tugs Trust along with his original head, wheelhouse, smokestack, and glasses (though at the moment, he is painted in the Lakesider lll livery). He was voiced by Timothy Bateson. In the Japanese dub, he was voiced by Masaaki Tsukada. In Salty's Lighthouse, he was named Otis and was voiced by Ian James Corlett. He is also the only Tug seen with a red waterline on his hull.
Top Hat is a railway tug with a top hat and monocle, and is number 4. He is very uppity and snobbish and tends to look down on most tugs, especially the Z-Stacks. He also believes he is the best tug in the Star Fleet. Despite his self-absorbed and arrogant demeanor, he means well, works hard and despite rarely showing it, he cares for the rest of the Star Fleet. He speaks in a posh English accent. He proved his ability in a crisis when he averted disaster in the episode "High Tide".  After the filming of Tugs ended, sadly, Top Hat's model was presumed to be lost. He is one of the two Tugs characters from the Star Fleet who has not been sold to The Star Tugs Trust, along with Grampus. If Top Hat's model is found in the future, he may have his shocked face mask on. His other face masks are currently the only parts that are last left of him. Top Hat's basis was New York Central Tugboat 13. He was voiced by John Baddeley. In the Japanese dub, he was voiced by Masashi Ebara. In Salty's Lighthouse, he was voiced by French Tickner.
Warrior has a large face and blue flat cap, and speaks with a burly London accent, and is number 5. He usually works with Big Mac and sometimes, Top Hat. He is often clumsy and rather dimwitted, but tries not to mess up. He is known only to get in the way of the Z-Stacks. He is extremely hardworking, despite the fact that his inherent clumsiness often leads to problems. He is loyal, strong-willed, and determined, and never gives up. Despite Warrior's shortcomings, he has proved himself to be a valuable member of the Star Fleet with notable examples being when he helped put out the fires, saved Izzy Gomez and stopped the logs that were flowing from up the river. He was voiced by Mike O'Malley. In the Japanese dub, he was voiced by Mitsuaki Madono. In Salty's Lighthouse, he was voiced by French Tickner.
Hercules is an ocean-going tug who is tasked with escorting large vessels to port, or answering distress calls at sea, and is number 6. He is in charge of large operations and important contracts. Hercules is a cool-headed fighter. He speaks with a clear, soft tone and received pronunciation, but his words are often hard. Although he can be strict and serious with his comrades, he also displays a gentler side and a sense of humor on occasion. Nothing can break him and not even the antics of the Z-Stacks and Bluenose can set him back. He is held in high regard by most of the tugs in the harbour, and even Zorran knows that he cannot win a confrontation with Hercules. He is not as seen as often as the other Star Tugs, mainly due to him being on his own missions. Hercules is famously known for referring to his colleagues as "m'dears", "old darlings", and "sweetheart". Because Hercules is an ocean-going tug, he was only seen in a few episodes.  There were plans for a Hercules-centred episode set out at sea, but this episode was never filmed.  Hercules' basis is that of Hercules (1907). He was voiced by Sean Barrett. In the Japanese dub, he was voiced by Sukekiyo Kameyama. In Salty's Lighthouse, he was voiced by Paul Dobson.
Sunshine is a small salvage tug who performs various tasks, and is number 7. Sunshine can be occasionally cheeky at times, but he is very strong willed nevertheless. He is quick-witted and takes action swiftly without hesitation. He is generally level-headed and cheerful, and takes on most jobs with little complaining. He also appears to have a slight crush on Sally Seaplane. Sunshine speaks with a Geordie accent. Sunshine was voiced by Shaun Prendergast. In the Japanese dub, he was voiced by Yūko Mita. In Salty's Lighthouse, Sunshine was the sister of Ten Cents and was voiced by Lenore Zann.
Grampus is a small submarine who formerly worked for the Navy, and is numbered 8. He appears for the first time in the episode "Pirate", in which he helped to prove Ten Cents' innocence. In the episode "Regatta", he saved Lillie Lightship from sinking by plugging the hole in her side with his front. Later, he was nearly blown up by Bluenose the naval tug having been branded as 'too old' for further service and was out of commission. He was thankfully swiftly rescued by the Star Tugs Ten Cents, Big Mac, O.J., and Top Hat. On the same day, he was bought by Captain Star and joined the Star Fleet as their first Star submarine. He speaks with a Central English accent (with a noticeable lisp). Grampus also has a tendency to squirt water in the tug's faces, most prominently at Bluenose in "Regatta" and at Top Hat while he was sleeping in the episode "Ghosts". According to model maker Jeremy King, Grampus is a Plunger-class submarine and named after the decommissioned USS Grampus (SS-4). Spike Knight fashioned Grampus in fiberglass by looking at old Grampus photos. He used a "parallel lifting version of the tugs' pull along trolleys so he could surface." His model is one of two Star Tugs characters that has not been sold to The Star Tugs Trust, along with Top Hat, his face masks are currently the only part that is last left of him, if Grampus's model is found in the future, his model may have his thrilled face mask. He was voiced by Lee Cornes. In the Japanese dub, he was voiced by Sakurako Kishiro. In Salty's Lighthouse, he was voiced by French Tickner.
Captain Star is the owner of the Star Fleet. He narrates the series in the past tense. He is quite obviously a veteran sailor, and owns and cares for the Star Fleet. He always appears as a loudhailer in the window of the Star Dock building. He takes great pride in his fleet. He is usually very strict if something does not go as shipshape as it is supposed to, though he does display traces of humour in his narration. Captain Star was voiced by Patrick Allen. In the Japanese dub, he was voiced by Rokurō Naya. In Salty's Lighthouse, Captain Star was a female character and was voiced by Lenore Zann.

Z-Stacks
The Z-Stacks are a clan of devious, tricky scheming gangster boats. Their symbol is a black stack with two white circles up top and a white O on both sides. Members have brown bodies and fly a black flag with a white O. Their leader is Captain Zero, although the first tug Zorran runs the day-to-day operations. They regularly find ways to hinder and infuriate their rival Star Fleet tugs. Their physical appearance is modeled after the 1920s Moran tugs that were active in New York City.

Zorran

Zorran is Captain Zeros first tug, and the fleet leader of the Z-Stacks, and is number 1. He is a harbour tug who hatches various devious schemes against the Star Fleet. Zorran is looked up to in fear from most of the other tugs. However, though being able to generally get what he is looking for, Zorran is depicted as a very pragmatic tug, who will be devious only as far as common sense and necessity allows.

The majority of the episodes portray him as a leading antagonist in some way. Although he is undoubtedly the most intelligent Z-Stack, his plans usually end up backfiring: either through the incompetence of the other Z-Stacks or his own overconfidence. Zorran has shown to regularly employ switchers Zip and Zug to carry out his operations, which more often than not results in adverse consequences.

Zorran was voiced by Chris Tulloch. In the Japanese dub, he was voiced by Hajime Koseki. In Salty's Lighthouse, he was voiced by Scott McNeil.

Zebedee
Zebedee is Captain Zeros second tug; he performs a variety of tasks around Bigg City Port, and is number 2. Like the other Z-Stacks, Zebedee is based on the NYC Moran Fleet tugs from the 1920s. His personality resembles Shemp Howard. Zebedee is one of the more complex Tugs characters, an easy going tug who winds up the Star Fleet for a reason or another, mean and vindictive on the outside, but on the inside there is much to his personality. Beneath his tough exterior is the only Z-Stack to have a conscience.  Zebedee was the focus of the only episode that centred on a Z-Stack, "High Winds"

In this episode "High Winds", Zebedee is bullied into helping an evil tramper, but he feels guilty about it, and his guilty conscious leads him to help the Star Tugs on a couple of occasions. Ten Cents suggests he joins the Star Tugs but he refuses. Zebedee's lighter side was never examined again in the series, but it was in another form of media which stated his owner was Captain Star, meaning it would have been expanded on in Season 2.

He was voiced by Sean Barrett. In the Japanese dub, he was voiced by Kōji Ishii. In Salty's Lighthouse, his name was pronounced "Zee-Bee" and was voiced by Ian James Corlett.

Zak
Zak is the third member of the Z-Stacks and usually works with Zebedee, and is number 3. Like the rest of the Zero Marine, Zak is based on the Moran Fleet tugs from the Roaring 20s. Zak has been seen as a second-in-command to Zorran.  His role is not as prominent as the only Z-Stacks- the only episodes in which he plays a major role are "Munitions" and "High Tide". He also has two non-speaking appearances, in "Warrior" and "Bigg Freeze". He is quite a sinister character- he relishes the idea of blowing up any Tug who gets too near him in "Munitions", and in "Jinxed", he offers to sink Boomer.

He was voiced by Shaun Prendergast. In the Japanese dub, he was voiced by Hideyuki Umezu. In Salty's Lighthouse, he was voiced by Scott McNeil.

Zug
Zug is the fourth tug in the Z-Stacks, and is numbered 4. He is a harbour switcher that tows barges and works on liner docking operations. He mainly works with Zip, and likes to think of himself as the intelligent one. He comes up with devious plans for him and Zip to use (although the plans usually fail). Zug's capabilities range from the towing of barges to liner docking operations. Like the rest of the Zero Marine, Zug is based on the Moran Fleet tugs of the 1920s. He is sneaky, cowardly and he needs the other Z-Stacks around for courage. Zug is a scheming sort of tug, though his plans rarely if ever work as planned. Zug is intimidated by the main Z-Stack Zorran and has a tendency to be somewhat nervous and jittery around him.

Zug's most prominent appearances were in the episode "Trapped", when a tramper he was towing accidentally got jammed across the river, and in the final episode "Bigg Freeze", when he and Zip trapped Ten Cents and Sunshine in a gully, mistakenly believing they were going to  steal a fuel contract from Zorran.

He was voiced by Nigel Anthony, with a Central European accent reminiscent of Peter Lorre. In the Japanese dub, he was voiced by Tarô Arakawa. In Salty's Lighthouse, he was voiced by Scott McNeil.

Zip
Zip is the second harbour switcher in the Z-Stacks fleet, and is number 5. He works alongside Zug on minor contracts such as the freighting of quarried boulders. Zip is often described as 'Zug, only worse'. His head is often in the clouds, and he is well known for being a coward. He is easily scared and sometimes speaks out of turn, as well as being quick to back down when engaging in an argument, and is easily dominated.

He was voiced by John Baddeley. In the Japanese dub, he was voiced by Masashi Ebara. In Salty's Lighthouse, he was voiced by Ian James Corlett.

Captain Zero
Captain Zero is the owner of the Z-Stacks. Unlike Captain Star, he is a devious and scheming sailor. He is known to have criminal connections and was originally affiliated with Johnny Cuba before something happened between the two. He is also known to be quite bad tempered. Like Captain Star, he is never seen – his voice is heard through a loudhailer. Zero only speaks in a few episodes. His megaphone is seen in "Jinxed", but his dialogue was cut.

He was voiced by Sean Barrett. In the Japanese dub, he was voiced by Masaaki Tsukada. In Salty's Lighthouse, he was voiced by Paul Dobson.

Supporting
Izzy Gomez is a large tramp steamer who regularly visits Bigg City Port with items such as bananas from Puerto Grande. He has said numerous times that he would rather try to get into port on his own instead of being pulled by any of the tugs and he runs aground during an attempt in the episode "Warrior". TUGs was originally supposed to last 30 minutes.  Only two 30-minute cuts were ever filmed.  In the original 30-minute cut of "Jinxed", Boomer was seen crashing into Izzy Gomez's side. He was one of the models later used for Thomas & Friends after the production of Tugs shut down, his model was used as a tramp steamer seen at Brendam Docks from seasons 3–5. It is unknown where his model is currently. His face masks are currently the only parts that are the last left of him. Izzy spoke with a Mexican accent, and was voiced by Sean Barrett. In the Japanese dub, he was voiced by Rokurō Naya. In Salty's Lighthouse, he had an American accent (despite still having a sombrero and the Mexican flag painted on his smokestack) and was voiced by Paul Dobson.
Lillie is a lightship that is situated at Demder Rocks to warn shipping of potential hazards. She has a contract with the Star Fleet where they provide her with the necessary fuel and supplies to keep her light shining. She has a major role in the final episode "Bigg Freeze", appears briefly in several other episodes, and is mentioned in "Ghosts".  She was voiced by JoAnne Good. In the Japanese dub, she was voiced by Sakurako Kishiro. In Salty's Lighthouse, she was voiced by Lenore Zann.

Minor
The following is a list of fictional characters in the children's television series Tugs. All of these characters played supporting roles to the series' main characters' in the fictional harbour of Bigg City Port.

Tugboats

Sea Rogue
Sea Rogue, also known as "The Pirate", made his sole appearance in the episode of the same name, where he was technically the main character. In said episode, he stole barges for two mysterious green-eyed tugs, who had captured his uncle, and threatened to scuttle him unless Sea Rogue stole barges for them. The Green-Eyed Pirates were later caught out by Ten Cents, Sunshine, Grampus, and Sea Rogue himself, who devised a plan to capture the two fiends. Sea Rogue had been previously mistaken for the pirate himself, hence his nickname, and he later forgave the Star Tugs for ever thinking that about him. He then returned to a peaceful life with his uncle. He was voiced by Sean Barrett. In the Japanese dub, he was voiced by Keiji Fujiwara.

Sea Rogue's appearance was quite intimidating, especially his eye patch, a typical pirate trademark. He was a blackish blue tug in color, and did not seem to work for any particular fleet; although the "Mi" symbol on his stack suggests that he works for the munitions company, as the same symbol is seen on the factory and warehouse doors. His model was later repainted to be used for Bluenose.

Sea Rogue also appeared on the TLC TV series, Salty's Lighthouse, except he became a villain who steals cargo (but only existed in Top Hat's dreams). Here, he was voiced by Paul Dobson.

Bluenose
Bluenose is an obnoxious navy tug, whom both the Star Fleet and Z-Stacks despise. He plays precisely by the rules and acts as a kind of stereotypical army drill sergeant towards the other tugs. He is annoying, pompous, and self-centered, and despite appearing in only two episodes of the series ("Regatta" and "Munitions") he caused a major impact and is often referred to as a major character. He speaks with a regimented Army English accent.

His major storyline was involved with blowing up the midget submarine Grampus in target practice, but Grampus was saved at the last minute and later became a member of the Star Fleet. After the episode "Munitions", Bluenose was left a nervous wreck, after a terrible night at the docks involving the death of the naval tramp steamer Kraka-Toa.  He is later towed away by Grampus. He was not seen again after this as his model was repainted back into Sea Rogue.

He was voiced by Mike O'Malley. In the Japanese dub, he was voiced by Rokurō Naya. In Salty's Lighthouse, he was voiced by Scott McNeil.

The term 'bluenose' was a nickname for people who came from the Canadian province of Nova Scotia - in the context of the show it may also have been a pun on the term 'Brown-nose', or suck-up - given Bluenose's orders-following mentality it can be said that he is a 'naval brown-nose', hence, possibly, 'Bluenose'.

Fire Chief

The Fire Chief made brief appearances in four episodes- "High Winds", "Quarantine", "Jinxed", and "Bigg Freeze", though he had no dialogue in "Jinxed".  He is level-headed and down-to-earth. He is usually bright eyed, although his stubble makes him appear quite rough. He speaks with a Cockney accent. He is painted white and red.  He is last seen confronting Zip and Zug for stealing a fire barge.

Like Billy Shoepack, the Fire Tug could move his head and eyes rather than immobile features.

He was voiced by Sean Barrett. In the Japanese dub, he was voiced by Kōji Ishii.

Boomer
Boomer is a tug that appears only in the episode "Jinxed".  He is found drifting by Ten Cents and Sunshine, where he revealed he was a jinx, which Ten Cents was very sceptical about. After many incidents, including almost sinking and his engine failing then catching fire, Ten Cents finally believed that he had a bad luck streak. After he was repaired at Lucky's Yard, Captain Star decided that Boomer was to become a houseboat, and he now resides at an upriver jetty called "Dun Tuggin" where he can relax all day, and the jinx has finally left him.

Boomer was originally called Captain Harry, and he says that he became jinxed when his name was changed to Boomer. Boomer is the only tug apart from Sunshine, who was initiated at the end of the first episode, to become a Star Tug during the series, even if it was only for a very short period. He was also very briefly a Z-Stack when he helped Zip and Zug pull some munitions, but after the barge exploded Captain Zero got rid of him. Boomer's model as a tug is distinctly visible at the beginning of the episode "Up River", but he is never seen or mentioned again.

Boomer spoke with an Irish accent, and was voiced by Lee Cornes. In the Japanese dub, he was voiced by Tarô Arakawa. His model was reused for Sea Rogue's Uncle.

Boomer also appeared in Salty's Lighthouse, experiencing two very different adventures. In one episode he failed towing the schooner (as in the original TUGS) and became a 'vacation boat' in a story Ten Cents told to Zug. In the other one, he lost his 'bad luck' by successfully towing the schooner. During these episodes, he was voiced by Scott McNeil.

Boomer's history reflects the naval superstition that changing the name of a ship invokes bad-luck. His name in naval and military slang is the nickname for submarines armed with ballistic missiles/nuclear ICBMs - though it is highly improbable that Boomer has any connection to nuclear weapons (having predated their invention by two decades) it can safely be said that he had a similarly intense impact on the tugs of Bigg City Port.

Billy Shoepack

Billy Shoepack is an alligator tug. He is mischievous, but ultimately a good character, saving the day in both of the two episodes he appeared in- "Trapped" and "Up River".  He carries supplies such as fuses and dynamite to the Upriver towns. Billy spoke with a strong West Country accent, and was voiced by Lee Cornes. In the Japanese dub, he was voiced by Mitsuaki Madono in "Trapped" and Rokurō Naya in "Up River". In Salty's Lighthouse, he was voiced by Paul Dobson.

Sea Rogue's Uncle
Sea Rogue's Uncle was never named, although he was referred to as "Old Man" by his nephew Sea Rogue. He was an elderly tug with a brownish color scheme, appearing only in "Pirate". He was kidnapped by the "Green-Eyed" tugs, who held him as ransom in order to make his nephew steal barges, and was later rescued by Grampus.

He was voiced by Mike O'Malley. In the Japanese dub, he was voiced by Masaaki Tsukada. His model was reused from Boomer.

Burke and Blair
Burke and Blair were notorious scrap dealers, and scavengers. Burke was clean shaven, and Blair was the one who had a moustache. They were always seen together, and had small appearances in many episodes across the series.  The only episode in which they speak is "Quarantine", when they try to convince Captain Star to sell O.J. for scrap.  They pester him throughout the episode, and when O.J. is towed back to the pier by Ten Cents and Sunshine following yet another breakdown, it looks as though the writing is on the wall.  But, on learning that O.J. saved Ten Cents from Quarantine, Captain Star decides to pay for a brand new engine.

Burke and Blair were often seen in the background, most notably at the end of the episode "Ghosts". Their names come from the notorious Edinburgh corpse sellers Burke and Hare and they are sort of tugboat versions to their human counterparts, in that they deal in dead boats - not people. Nigel Anthony voiced Burke and Sean Barrett voiced Blair. In the Japanese dub, Hideyuki Umezu voiced Burke and Mitsuaki Madono voiced Blair.

In Tugs American counterpart, Salty's Lighthouse, Burke and Blair were movie producers called Mr. Boffo and Mr. Socko. Here, they were both voiced by Paul Dobson.

The Pirates
The Pirates were a pair of villainous tugboats who slipped into Bigg City Port with the intention of stealing loaded barges that could be sold off illegally for trade. To increase their security, they used Sea Rogue as their decoy. To make sure that he performed their bidding, they took Sea Rogue's uncle hostage and threatened to sink him if he disobeyed them. With the unexpected help of Zip and Zug, the Star Fleet and Sea Rogue were able to capture the pirate tugs and hand them into the authorities.

The pirate tugs were mysterious-looking vessels with black paint and a distinguishable pair of green-tinted spotlights to resemble Night-vision Goggles. They are known among fans as 'The Green-Eyed Things'. The pirate tugs are among the few speaking tugboats among the cast that do not have faces.

They were voiced by John Baddeley and Mike O'Malley respectively. In the Japanese dub, they were both voiced by Rokurō Naya. Their models were later turned into Burke and Blair.

The White Fleet
The White Fleet are four faceless white tugboats who came to Bigg City Port during the midst of winter. They are simply white boats- they are not given voices or faces.  They came from 'northern waters' in search of an iceberg, and travelled about the harbour at night with engines 'off', listening for cracking ice. They were mistaken by the Star Fleet, Zorran, and Izzy Gomez for the phantoms of a tug fleet that sank in the great storm of 1912. After an eventful night, Hercules revealed the truth behind the White Fleet. Since then, the Star Tugs found they could laugh it off, but never forgot the night when fog nearly drove them crazy.

The Coast Guard
The Coast Guard is a small vessel who acts as customs officer for the port. He often stands at the entrance to the estuary; ready to question and check incoming shipping before clearance. On other occasions, he stands by and over-looks large-scale operations, such as demolition and quarry work. He also doubled as a 'one-man' police-force. Despite his diminutive size, he has heavy influence and authority over the vessels of the port. He made brief appearances in several episodes.  In every episode he appeared in he made an arrest- though he was unsuccessful in "High Winds".  A the end of "Warrior" and "Quarantine" respectively, he arrested Izzy Gomez and Nantucket.   Because of his small size, remote eye mechanisms could not be fitted into his model.

He was one of the models passed on to Thomas and Friends after the production of Tugs shut down, he was seen in season 4, but it is unknown where his model is at the moment. In the Buzz Books, the Coast Guard was referred to as the Customs Launch.

He spoke in a posh English accent, and was voiced by Lee Cornes. In the Japanese dub, he was voiced by Sukekiyo Kameyama. In Salty's Lighthouse, the Coast Guard was called Cappy and was voiced by Paul Dobson.

Davy Jones
A small motor boat with a shrill whistle, he appeared only briefly in "Regatta" to inform the Star Fleet of Lillie Lightship's predicament; having been sent by the Coast Guard to deliver the message. The same small vessel doubled as the 'mad' speed boat that caused the accident in "Quarantine". He was in this form before "Regatta", as he appears in the liner scene of Warrior in "Sunshine". He is located beside the Fire Launch.

He was voiced by Nigel Anthony. In the Japanese dub, he was voiced by Mitsuaki Madono. In Salty's Lighthouse, he was mistakenly thought to be the same character as the Coast Guard and also became Cappy. Just like the other Cappy, he was voiced by Paul Dobson.

Ocean liners

The Duchess
The Duchess appears in "Sunshine", the very first episode, making her the first ocean liner we encounter in the series. She only appeared in two scenes in the whole of that episode: first when the Star's were towing her in, and again in the nighttime firework celebrations following a successful journey. In appearance, she looked a lot like Princess Alice - and it is possible she was the same model - only with modified funnels and ventilators.

Her profile card in the Tugs board game gave her nationality as British.

Princess Alice
Princess Alice was the most prominent of the three Liners - she appeared in three episodes ("High Winds", "High Tide", and "Regatta"), in "High Winds", she was in need of repair and the Stars (and Zebedee) all fought against the heavy winds to bring her safely into port. When she appeared in the 4th episode "Regatta", she was fully repaired - and was celebrating Independence Day heartily with the other vessels whilst being loaded by Big Mickey. In "High Tide", she only made a brief cameo.

In spite of her name, the voiceover in Regatta is male and is voiced by Mike O'Malley.

Her profile card in the Tugs board game gives her nationality as American.

S.S. Vienna
S.S. Vienna appeared in the episode "Bigg Freeze", in which the Star Tugs and Z-Stacks alike were eagerly awaiting her return. In some videos she appears in the opening credits, and her model also made a brief appearance in "Sunshine".

The model used for S.S. Vienna was later reused for Thomas & Friends, which can be seen at Brendam Docks. It is renamed S.S. Roxstar in a Season 4 episode - "Henry & the Elephant".

Vienna was given her name solely to create an excuse for the characters to say "Goodnight, Vienna!" at the end of "Bigg Freeze" - in a further in-joke, Goodnight Vienna was the fourth solo album of Thomas narrator Ringo Starr.

Tramp steamers

Johnny Cuba
Johnny Cuba is a notorious, violent criminal tramp steamer. His strong accent and dialect indicate that he is from Australia, although in a Tugs-themed card game it is said that he is from Cuba. Like Sea Rogue and Boomer, his sole appearance was as a major character.

Johnny had arrived at Bigg City Port to make plans with fellow gangsters during a period of strong and troublesome tempest weather. When he arrived, he met Zebedee and threatened him by manipulating him into helping him into the port.

Johnny sent Zebedee on an errand to steal a barge of coal, and threatened to sink him if he landed either of them in trouble. Due to a feud between Johnny Cuba and Captain Zero that occurred in the past, Zebedee was placed in an awkward and dangerous situation, until Hercules  discovered his hide-out in an abandoned dock. Zebedee plucked up the courage to trap Johnny and have him arrested, and was forgiven. Despite Johnny's claim that "they can't hold Johnny Cuba!", they did. Johnny Cuba only appeared in "High Winds", but his model made five more brief appearances in "Sunshine", "Quarantine", "Ghosts", "Munitions" and "Regatta". In "Regatta" it sank in Demder Rocks after colliding with Lillie Lightship. His superstructure and funnel were used for Old Rusty.

Johnny Cuba made a second appearance in the annual story, "The Missing Barge", where he is still doing crime but no one wants to go near him.

Johnny made a third appearance in the Buzz Book "Nothing to Declare", in which he helps the Navy by trapping a spy submarine and proves himself to have a good and patriotic streak.

He was voiced by Mike O'Malley. In the Japanese dub, he was voiced by Tarô Arakawa. In Salty's Lighthouse, his name was changed to Steamer and was a friendly character instead of a villain. Here, he was voiced by French Tickner.

Nantucket
Nantucket is a dirty old tramper and a notorious villain, whom the Tugs call Dirt Bucket. His only appearance was in "Quarantine", in which he attempted to trick Sunshine into taking him into port by pulling down the yellow "waiting for clearance" flag. After his plan was foiled, he was sentenced by the Coast Guard to a further forty days in quarantine along with Zorran (who had fallen for the trick and pulled alongside him). He spoke with a Lancastrian accent provided by Mike O'Malley. In the Japanese dub, he was voiced by Kōji Ishii.

Nantucket's hull was later used for Old Rusty. He also appeared as the tramper that Billy Shoepack blew up in "Trapped".

In Salty's Lighthouse, Nantucket's name was changed to Tramper. He became a friendly character, and sometimes could not speak (in which case a foghorn sound effect was used instead). In the appearances where he did speak, he was voiced by Paul Dobson.

Kraka-Toa
This non-speaking naval tramp steamer made her first appearance in "Ghosts" and her final appearance in "Munitions". Due to a fuel drum falling onto some explosives after Bluenose hit Zorran's barge, the dock caught fire; thus setting off the explosives and fuel loaded in her at the time. Since she was nearly full, the contents did indeed "rip her apart" as Zorran predicted, and she sank into the bay, but continued to appear in the background hinting she was recovered. She never spoke. She was named after the Krakatoa volcano, which famously erupted in 1883, causing much devastation.

Old Rusty
Old Rusty is possibly a naval tramp steamer, who made only one brief appearance, at the end of the episode "Warrior"; anchored out in the estuary. Warrior dozed off and bumped into him, telling him to look where he was going, but Old Rusty said that he had been anchored there for two years. He took it in good humour, and when Old Warrior had gone, he remarked that life would be very boring without Warrior.

Old Rusty was voiced by series director and co-creator David Mitton. In the Japanese dub, he was voiced by Kōji Ishii. In Salty's Lighthouse, he was voiced by Paul Dobson.

Dockside and floating cranes

Big Mickey
Big Mickey is described as 'the Port's biggest crane', based on a USN 20t tower crane. He was once stationed at the steel works quay for loading and unloading operations when the Star and Zero fleets were competing for the steel company contract. He was later transferred to the naval dock for the loading of the naval tramper Kraka-Toa. He has two note-worthy appearances in "High Tide" and "Munitions".

There is some debate as to the fate of Big Mickey. In the television release of "Munitions", it is stated that Big Mickey had fallen into shallow water and survived. However, this narration was deleted in the video release. According to the tugboats' reactions he perished to save them, although this may simply mean he took a big fall for them.

The model used for the Big Mickey character was recycled to be used in Thomas the Tank Engine and Friends, originally starting off as a background prop, he later became a character on the show retaining the same name. He is one of the only two Tugs characters (the other being the S.S. Vienna) to survive the transition into CGI. In season 21, he was given a face and the ability to speak again.

He was voiced by Timothy Bateson. In the Japanese dub, he was voiced by Masaaki Tsukada in "High Tide" and Tarô Arakawa in "Munitions". When he gained a face in Thomas & Friends, Rob Rackstraw took over as the English voice actor for Big Mickey.

Mighty Mo
Mighty Mo is Bigg City Port's largest floating crane, well known for his booming voice. He is used for many salvage operations, in which he usually takes charge. He appeared in four episodes, most notably "Jinxed", in which his hawser jammed whilst lifting Boomer out of the water. He also appeared in the episodes "Warrior", "Quarantine" and "Regatta".

He was voiced by Mike O'Malley. In the Japanese dub, he was voiced by Kōji Ishii.

Little Ditcher
Little Ditcher is a small dirty A-frame crane, and is therefore, one of the smaller floating cranes to be found in the port. He is sometimes used dredging up-river at Mittsville or for oyster fishing in the estuary, as well as various other jobs. His size makes him unsuitable for rescue operations. He is good friends with the Star Tugs, and appeared for the first time in "Trapped".  He also appeared in ""Up River", where he helped divert the logjam away from Uptown, and briefly in "Warrior", where Warrior accidentally bumped into him and sent him spinning.  He took it in good part, however, laughing along with Pearl and Sunshine.

Little Ditcher was voiced by Timothy Bateson. In the Japanese dub, he was voiced by Keiji Fujiwara in all of his appearances; excluding "Trapped" where he was voiced by Kōji Ishii. In Salty's Lighthouse, he became a female (along with Captain Star and Sunshine) and was voiced by Lenore Zann.

Scuttlebutt Pete
Scuttlebutt Pete is a dredger and a notorious gossip - hence his name. He believes in ghosts, and enjoys voicing superstitions and telling old sea stories, particularly when the fog comes around.

Although he can be grumpy, he is a friend to the Star Tugs. However, dredger detail is an unpopular task with the tugs, and is often given out by the Captains as punishment. He speaks with an exaggerated Dublin accent.

He was voiced by Mike O'Malley. In the Japanese dub, he was voiced by Hideyuki Umezu. In Salty's Lighthouse, he was voiced by French Tickner.

He appeared in four episodes- "Pirate", "Warrior", "Ghosts" and "High Winds".  Though he never had much screen time, his appearances in "Ghosts" and "High Winds" serve as a catalyst to the episode's plot- the Tugs' fear of the strange white Tugs is sparked by an old sea yarn told by Scuttlebutt Pete.  In "High Winds", Zebedee shows his good side when he helps Ten Cents and Sunshine to steady the crane during a storm.

Jack the Grappler
Jack the Grappler is a garbage scooper who works at the "Municipal Garbage Corporation" quay for garbage barges, particularly Lord Stinker. He assisted in the organisation of the Municipal Garbage Corporation float for the annual regatta. He first appears in "Regatta" (in which he briefly wore an Uncle Sam-style top hat). In the episode "Bigg Freeze", he had a cold (as he was shown with a red nose)- there was originally some dialogue in this segment, but it was cut.  In the series, the narrator refers to him as "Jack the Grappler", possibly indicating a pun on Jack the Ripper (if only in name). He is the only crane with a face.

He was voiced by Mike O'Malley. In the Japanese dub, he was voiced by Hideyuki Umezu. In Salty's Lighthouse, he became Scoop and was voiced by Paul Dobson.

Snatcher
Snatcher was a Cut "Ghost" Crane Character that was eventually going to appear in a deleted scene in the episode "Ghosts". he was believed to be the Ghost of Big Mickey, but, he was the only crane character that was supposed to have a Face, A Face that looked Horrific And Scary-ish and resembled the Frankenstein monster's Face. While O.J is steaming through the Crane inlet, he sees Snatcher and gets a Spook, but then within a blink, O.J finds that Snatcher's Face Has Disappeared. His Face Was displayed once at an event at Tugs: The Exhibition.

Barges

Lord Stinker
Lord Stinker is an aged garbage barge, widely known for carrying a heavy stench, and notably wears a peg on his nose to avoid his own strong odor.

He works mostly with Warrior. He is also a quick thinker as he saved a train from disaster in "High Tide", which gained him a newfound respect from Top Hat.

He was voiced by Timothy Bateson. In the Japanese dub, he was voiced by Tarô Arakawa in all of his appearances; excluding "Warrior" where he was voiced by Sukekiyo Kameyama. In Salty's Lighthouse, he was voiced by Ian James Corlett.

Frank and Eddie
Frank and Eddie are a pair of twin railway barges (also known as Car floats) who work mostly with Top Hat the railway tug. They are used for the transportation of railway stock across the port. They are very quick-witted and are among the few that can deal with Top Hat's superiority. Both of the twins speak with Cockney accents.  They had supporting roles in "Munitions" and "High Tide".

Mike O'Malley voiced Frank and Timothy Bateson voiced Eddie. In the Japanese dub, Frank was voiced by Keiji Fujiwara while Eddie was voiced by Tarô Arakawa in "Munitions" and Sukekiyo Kameyama in "High Tide". In Salty's Lighthouse, they were both voiced by Ian James Corlett.

Pearl
Pearl is an oyster barge, who made only one very brief appearance in Warrior, working with Sunshine and Little Ditcher.
She was voiced by JoAnne Good. In the Japanese dub, she was voiced by Sakurako Kishiro.

Sugar Ray
Sugar Ray is a Cut Rainbow-colored barge that should have appeared in the original episode 2.

Other

The Fultan Ferry
The Fultan Ferry is a paddle-driven ferry boat used for freighting vehicles and goods across the harbour. It appeared in various episodes, but was finally named in "Quarantine", when it was temporarily sunk in the middle of the port after hitting a fire barge towed by O.J. It was later salvaged by Mighty Moe.

Although the Ferry never spoke in the original show, it was voiced by Scott McNeil in Salty's Lighthouse (despite not having a visible face or megaphone). It also happened to be confirmed as a male, and even went under the name Fultan by Grampus.

Since Tugs ceased production, the Fultan Ferry has appeared briefly in Thomas the Tank Engine and Friends.

The Shrimpers
The Shrimpers appear briefly in "Warrior and "Ghosts". They had a note-worthy role in "Ghosts", when a group of four or five were accidentally led into a mud-bank whilst following Warrior back to port; using him as a guide through the fog.  They have a minor role in "Warrior".

Their models were passed on to Thomas and Friends after the production of TUGS shut down. They were seen in Season 4 around the Skarloey Railway and the docks. It is currently unknown where their models are at the moment.

They were voiced by both John Baddeley and Chris Tulloch. In the Japanese dub, they were voiced by Sukekiyo Kameyama, Keiji Fujiwara, and Hideyuki Umezu.

O. Krappenschitt
O. Krappenschitt is The owner of the Municipal Garbage Corporation yard who organizes the 'Municipal Garbage Corporation' float for the annual regatta. He only appeared in a famous scene from "Regatta". Although he was never referred to by name, his office door revealed it to be O. Krappenschitt.

He was voiced by Timothy Bateson. In the Japanese dub, he was voiced by Masaaki Tsukada. In Salty's Lighthouse, he was voiced by Paul Dobson.

Quarry Master
The owner of the rock quarry, who appears briefly in "Warrior". He was voiced by John Baddeley. In the Japanese dub, he was voiced by Masaaki Tsukada.

In Salty's Lighthouse, the Quarry Master was given the name Stoney and was voiced by Paul Dobson.

The Fuel Depot Owner
The owner of the Fuel Depot appears briefly in Bigg Freeze, having to put up with Zorran's impatience. He was voiced by Lee Cornes. In the Japanese dub, he was voiced by Rokurō Naya.

Sally Seaplane
Sally is a seaplane who is a friend of the Star Fleet, who have the contract to provide her fuel. Sunshine appears to have a slight crush on her. She appears only briefly in a selected number of episodes, and spoke only in Sunshine.

Sally's technical definition is a 'Flying Boat' because her main source of buoyancy, like a ship, comes from her hull/fuselage with small floats on each wing to stabilize her, unlike the other form of seaplane - the 'floatplane' which uses a normal aircraft fuselage with large floats slung underneath to support it on water. If we expand on this she can be termed an 'Amphibious Flying Boat', like the Douglas Dolphin, because she has fold-up landing gear on her fuselage, allowing her to land on runways as well as water.

Sally's tail-number is S-ALLY, a fictional sequence that would not be assigned to a real plane - any civil aircraft registered in the United States has a tail-number beginning with the letter 'N'.

As the original prop has been presumed lost, The Star Tugs Trust are receiving a rebuilt Sally model from the owner of the original Seaplane molds, arriving in Easter 2017.

She was voiced by JoAnne Good. In the Japanese dub, she was voiced by Sakurako Kishiro. In Salty's Lighthouse, she was voiced by Lenore Zann.

Puffa
Puffa is a steam locomotive who works on the dockside railway at Bigg City Port. Used for a variety of tasks within the port and at the docks up river, he is a trusted friend of the Star Fleet and Warrior in particular. He has made two appearances in "Up River" and "Munitions", and also made a brief appearance in "High Tide". Other trains seen around Bigg City have the same whistle-sound and feature similar styling as Puffa. In "Munitions", he was warned by Ten Cents, O.J., Zorran, Zak, and Zebedee to escape from a dockside fire. In the episode "Up River", he raced down river from the logging camps inland to warn Top Hat, Warrior, and O.J. that a broken log jam was headed toward them (propelled by an explosion of dynamite, kudos to Billy Shoepack).

He was voiced by John Baddeley. In the Japanese dub, he was voiced by Hideyuki Umezu. In Salty's Lighthouse, Puffa was most of the time known as the Mail Train. In one episode, however, he was briefly referred to as Chooch. Here, he was voiced by Paul Dobson. 

Puffa is a DRG Class 80 with Oil Burning Headlamp, Diamond Smokestack, and Cowcatcher and He also burns wood instead of coal. Puffa is also painted in a Silver-Like Gray Livery

His Whistle Was Last used in the Wombling Free song "Wombling white tie And trails" Which came from Union Pacific No. 4466

Little Owl
Little Owl is a tank locomotive that made several brief appearances, most notably in "High Tide".

The Buoys
There are several bell buoys across Bigg City Port, most of them yellow. Notably, one appeared very briefly in "Pirate", having been 'silenced' by the pirates in order to make their escape, and getting bumped into by Warrior when he was working with Top Hat to catch the thief. The buoy was voiced by Shaun Prendergast. In the Japanese dub, he was voiced by Sakurako Kishiro.

In the episode "Jinxed", a "Wreck" Buoy appeared very briefly, as well as when Ten Cents hoots his whistle to test the Jinx, a nearby marker buoy ("Dem-Der") sinks. This was the only appearance of these two buoys.

Philbert
Philbert is A Bell Buoy Who Only Appears in the episode "Pirate". He Had a minor role in the episode where he got bumped by Warrior and got "Muffled" by the Pirates. He was never referred by name. He was voiced by Shaun Prendergast. in the Japanese dub, he was voiced by Sakurako Kishiro.

Props

Steam Schooner

The Steam Schooner that appeared in "Quarantine" was A Prop that Never got voiced. It has Johnny Cuba's Whistle.

Fishing Boats

Fishing boats are boats that collect fish, They're Models are expected to be lost.

The Steam Yacht

The Steam Yact was an Unused Prop Boat that was expected to be lost as well.

References 

Tugs
Characters